Top Gear Hyper-Bike is a racing video game developed by Snowblind Studios and released for the Nintendo 64 in 2000.

Gameplay
Top Gear Hyper-Bike is a motorcycle racing video game that features three gameplay modes and six track layouts. A track editor where players can create their own tracks is also included in the game.

Development
As a follow-up to Top Gear Overdrive, Top Gear Hyper-Bike was developed by Snowblind Studios and runs on an enhanced version of its engine. To make the motorcycle handling and animations more realistic, the game's polygonal racers were segmented into six independent parts. The sound effects of the motorcycle engines were recorded from real bikes in a dealership. The game was presented at the Electronic Entertainment Expo in 1999.

Reception

Top Gear Hyper Bike received "mixed" reviews according to the review aggregation website GameRankings.

References

External links
 

2000 video games
Kemco games
Motorcycle video games
Nintendo 64 games
Nintendo 64-only games
Top Gear (video game series)
Video games developed in the United States
Snowblind Studios games